Spheeris is a Greek surname.

People with the last name Spheeris:

 Chris Spheeris, new age composer
 Jimmie Spheeris (1949–1984), singer-songwriter
 Penelope Spheeris (born 1945), director, producer and screenwriter

Greek-language surnames
Surnames